Community Stadium  may refer to:

 American Express Community Stadium
 Brentford Community Stadium
 Colchester Community Stadium
 Donegal Community Stadium
 Falkirk Community Stadium
 Hilken Community Stadium
 Kyperounda Community Stadium
 Laithwaite Community Stadium
 Merseyrail Community Stadium
 Midland Community Stadium
 Moston Community Stadium
 Psevdas Community Stadium
 University of Lethbridge Community Stadium
 York Community Stadium